The 1929 Macdonald Brier, the Canadian men's national curling championship, was held from February 26 to March 1, 1929 at the Granite Club in Toronto, Ontario.

Team Manitoba won their second consecutive Briar Tankard with Gordon Hudson as skip finishing round robin play undefeated. This was the first time a team went unbeaten in a single Brier. Hudson also became the first skip to win back-to-back Brier championships.

Teams
The teams are listed as follows:

Round Robin standings

Round Robin results

Draw 1

Draw 2

Draw 3

Draw 4

Draw 5

Draw 6

Draw 7

Draw 8

Draw 9

References 

Macdonald Brier, 1929
Macdonald Brier, 1929
The Brier
Curling in Toronto
Macdonald Brier
Macdonald Brier
Macdonald Brier
February 1929 events in North America
1920s in Toronto